"Silhouettes" is a song by Swedish house producer and DJ Avicii featuring vocals from Swedish singer Salem Al Fakir. The track was first released on 27 April 2012 in the United Kingdom. It had previously been leaked on the internet in early 2011, albeit with a different song pitch. Some music blogs erroneously posted "Flash" by Tatana and Scaloni.

Track listing

Chart performance
For the week ending 11 May 2012, "Silhouettes" debuted at number fifty on the Irish Singles Chart. The track marked Avicii's fourth appearance on the chart, following "Seek Bromance", "Collide", and "Levels" - which peaked at number forty-nine and number three respectively.

Music video
A music video was released on YouTube on 7 June 2012.  The music video shows a person before and after undergoing gender-affirming surgery. An alternate version just featuring Avicii performing at various venues in the United States has also been produced.

Charts and certifications

Weekly charts

Year-end charts

Certifications

Release history

References

External links
"Why "Silhouettes" Is The One Avicii Song That Fans Should Play To Understand The Late Musician's Influence On Pop Music on Bustle

2012 singles
2011 songs
Avicii songs
Song recordings produced by Avicii
Universal Music Group singles
Songs written by Avicii
Songs written by Salem Al Fakir
Songs written by Arash Pournouri